The Miss Oklahoma competition selects a winner to compete on behalf of Oklahoma in the Miss America pageant. Miss Oklahoma has won the Miss America crown on five occasions. Also, in the years when city representatives were common, Norma Smallwood won, competing as Miss Tulsa, giving the state of Oklahoma a total of six crowns. Oklahoma is also one of three states to win back to back Miss America titles.

Megan Gold of Edmond was crowned Miss Oklahoma 2022 on June 11, 2022 at the River Spirit Casino Resort in Tulsa, Oklahoma. She represented Oklahoma and competed for the title of Miss America 2023 at the Mohegan Sun in Uncasville, Connecticut in December 2022.

Gallery of past titleholders

Results summary
The following is a visual summary of the past results of Miss Oklahoma titleholders at the national Miss America pageants/competitions. The year in parentheses indicates the year of the national competition during which a placement and/or award was garnered, not the year attached to the contestant's state title.

Placements
 Miss Americas: Norma Smallwood** (1926), Jane Anne Jayroe (1967), Susan Powell (1981), Shawntel Smith (1996), Jennifer Berry (2006), Lauren Nelson (2007)
 1st runners-up: Bettye Cornelia Avert (1939), Betty Thompson (2012)
 2nd runners-up: Mary Nancy Denner (1958), Anita Bryant (1959), Lori Kelley (1989), Casey Preslar (2003), Alicia Clifton (2013), Kelsey Griswold (2014)
3rd runners-up: Addison Price (2020)
 4th runners-up: Donna Briggs (1948), Louise O'Brien (1951), Ann Campbell (1956), Nancy Chapman (1983), DuSharme Carter (1993), Emoly West (2011)
 Top 5: Virginia Howard** (1927)
 Top 10: Willie Mae Stockton* (1924), Bobby Jene Simmons (1952), Judy Adams (1971), Andrea Hanson (1974), Tamara Marler (1990), Cynthia White (1991), Julie Payne (1999), Kelley Scott (2004), Elizabeth Kinney (2005), Alexandra Eppler (2015), Georgia Frazier (2016)
 Top 12: Taylor Treat (2010), Sarah Klein (2017)
 Top 15: Ada Martyne Wood (1940), Mifaunwy Dolores Shunatona (1941), Ashley Thompson (2018)
 Top 20: Kaci Hundley (2002)

Oklahoma holds a record of 39 placements at Miss America.

Awards

Preliminary awards
 Preliminary Lifestyle and Fitness: Norma Smallwood** (1926), Ann Campbell (1956), Lauren Nelson (2007), Emoly West (2011), Kelsey Griswold (2014), Alexandra Eppler (2015)
 Preliminary Talent: Jane Anne Jayroe (1967), Judy Adams (1971), Susan Powell (1981) (tie), Lori Kelley (1989), Tamara Marler (1990), Julie Payne (1999), Casey Preslar (2003), Jennifer Berry (2006), Betty Thompson (2012), Alicia Clifton (2013)

Non-finalist awards
 Non-finalist Talent: Mary Ann Hazelton (1960), Jill Elmore (1980), Mignon Merchant (1987), Leesa Cornett (1988), Amy Duncan (1997), Kelli Masters (1998), Kristin Steveson (2001)

Other awards
 Miss Congeniality: Mifaunwy Dolores Shunatona (1941), Shirley Barbour (1953)
 America's Choice: Taylor Treat (2010), Betty Thompson (2012)
 Charles & Theresa Brown Scholarship: Alexandra Eppler (2015)
 Quality of Life Award Winners: Taylor Treat (2010)
 Quality of Life Award 1st Runners-up: Jennifer Berry (2006)
 Quality of Life Award Finalists: Alexandra Eppler (2015), Sarah Klein (2017)
 Special Judges' Award: Susan Supernaw (1972)

Winners

Notes

Venue
2007-Mabee Center

References

External links
 Miss Oklahoma

Oklahoma
Oklahoma culture
Women in Oklahoma
1923 establishments in Oklahoma
Recurring events established in 1923
Annual events in Oklahoma